SLC45A4 is a member of the SLC45 family of solute carriers. Analysis of the protein function in a recombinant yeast expression assay show that it can: (i) transport a disaccharide, sucrose, as well simple sugars such as glucose and fructose (ii) perform secondary active transport in a proton-dependent manner.

It is associated with sugar transport in the spermatozoa. Additionally, it has been identified as a necessary component in the cell death caused of the compound paraquat.

References 

Solute carrier family